The 1932–33 Serie A season was won by Juventus.

Teams
Palermo and Padova had been promoted from Serie B.

Final classification

Results

Top goalscorers

References and sources
Almanacco Illustrato del Calcio - La Storia 1898-2004, Panini Edizioni, Modena, September 2005

External links
  - All results with goalscorers on RSSSF Website.

Serie A seasons
Italy
1932–33 in Italian football leagues